Evelina Borea (born 1931, Ferrara, Italy) is an Italian art historian, author and curator.

Biography
Evelina Borea obtained a degree in History of Art in 1958 at the University of Florence. Her tutor and mentor was art historian Roberto Longhi.

In 1976 Borea edited a publication of Gian Pietro Bellori's Lives, with a preface by Giovanni Previtali for Einaudi.

Borea curated major exhibitions, notably Caravaggio e Caravaggeschi nelle Gallerie di Firenze (1970) and L'idea del bello in spring 2000. She is the author of studies on Domenichino (1965), Rosso Fiorentino (1965), Francesco Mochi (1966), Caravaggio and the Caravaggeschi (1966), and Annibale Carracci (1986).

Bibliography

References

Italian art historians
Writers from Ferrara
Italian art curators
1931 births
Living people
Women art historians